The following is a list of people who were decapitated, arranged alphabetically by country or region and with date of decapitation. These individuals lost their heads accidentally. This includes animal-related deaths. A list of people who lost their heads through execution or murder can be found at List of people who were beheaded.

Australia 

 Shirley Ann Durdin (1985) – Durdin was decapitated by a great white shark while snorkeling in Port Lincoln, South Australia; she was eaten alive
 Kerry McLoughlin (1987) – Decapitated by a saltwater crocodile at Cahills Crossing, Northern Territory

Argentina 

 Oscar Lofeudo (1998) – Decapitated in a TC pre-race qualifying in Rafaela circuit; Lofeudo was then co-driver along with Raúl Petrich (driver who also died).
 Daniel Ponce (2001) – Decapitated in a pick-up race, in San Martín, Mendoza.
 Matías Viapiano (2003) – Decapitated in a karting race in Estación Aráoz, Tucumán.

Chile 

 José Larenas (1980) – decapitated by a great white shark.

Costa Rica 

 Kike Cháves (1996) - decapitated in a karting crash in La Guácima circuit.

France

French Republic 

 Jean Larivière (1951) – decapitated in racing car crash in the 1951 24 Hours of Le Mans
 Gerry Birrell (1973) – decapitated in racing car crash

Germany

Modern Germany 

 Csaba Kesjár (1988) - decapitated in a German Formula 3 race, at the Norisring.

Great Britain 

 Hon. Henry William John, later 4th Earl of Strafford (1899) – decapitated by a train at Potters Bar railway station
 Donald Campbell (1967) – decapitated in crash of his hydroplane Bluebird K7 during world water speed record attempt in Coniston Water.

Netherlands/Belgium 

 Chris Bristow (1960) – decapitated in racing car crash in the 1960 Belgian Grand Prix.
 Alain Vincx (1987) – decapitated in car racing stunt challenge at Zandvoort Circuit.

Papua New Guinea 

 Melas Mero (2014) – decapitated by a saltwater crocodile

Philippines 

 Unnamed girl (2009) – decapitated by a saltwater crocodile

Portugal 

 Paulo Jorge Caracitas (2000) – decapitated while kart racing, when the scarf he was using got stuck in the drive shaft.

Romania 

 Nicolae Labiș (1956) – fell off of a tram while going to a friend's house and was decapitated when his head hit the pavement between the two trams in University Square, Bucharest.

Turkey 

 Tugba Erdogan (2013) - decapitated in a Karting crash.

United States 

 Tom Ketchum (1901) – accidentally decapitated in New Mexico Territory in botched hanging for train robbery
 Eva Dugan (1930) – decapitated in botched hanging for murder
 Denny Keith (1964) – decapitated in racing car crash
 Charles Bassett (1966) – decapitated in crash of T-38 jet aircraft
 Les Ritchey (1966) – decapitated in drag racing crash
 Ken Kotalac (1969) – decapitated in drag bike racing crash
 Rocky Marciano (1969) – decapitated when his airplane crashed
 François Cevert (1973) – cut in half in racing car crash at Watkins Glen International
 Helmuth Koinigg (1974) – decapitated in racing car crash in the 1974 United States Grand Prix
 Vic Morrow and Myca Dinh Le (1982) – decapitated by crashing helicopter during film shoot for Twilight Zone: The Movie
 3 members of the crew of Piper PA-28-181 Archer at the Cerritos mid-air collision (1986)
 Doug Vermeer (1987) – decapitated in car racing crash
 Jim Brouk (1990) – decapitated in car racing crash
 Randy Hill (1993) – decapitated in stunt car challenge; in a botched attempt at a mid-air collision, Hill's car was too low, its roof was sheared off, and Hill's head was crushed.
 Russell Phillips (1995) – decapitated in racing car crash at Charlotte Motor Speedway
 Randy Fry (2004) – decapitated by a great white shark
 Robert Lees (2004) – decapitated by murderer
 Katie Flynn (2005) – decapitated in car crash
 Asia Leeshawn Ferguson (2008) – decapitated by the Batman: The Ride rollercoaster at Six Flags Over Georgia
 Caleb Schwab (2016) – Caleb, the 10-year-old son of Kansas state representative Scott Schwab, was decapitated while sliding down the world's tallest water slide (Verrückt) at Schlitterbahn Kansas City in Kansas City, Kansas.

References 

beheaded